Frances Harriet Hooker ( Henslow; 30 April 1825 – 13 November 1874) was an English botanist.

In 1872, she translated A General System of Botany, Descriptive and Analytical by Emmanuel Le Maout and Joseph Decaisne into English from the original French.

Biography 
The daughter of Reverend John Stevens Henslow, a botany professor at the University of Cambridge, she was born Frances Harriet Henslow in Cambridge.

In 1851, she married Joseph Dalton Hooker; the couple had four sons and three daughters. Her daughter Harriet Anne Thiselton-Dyer was a botanical illustrator; her son, Reginald, was a statistician.

Death
Frances Harriet Hooker died in Kew, aged 49, on 13 November 1874.

References 

1825 births
1874 deaths
English botanists
English translators
19th-century British translators